Rodney Thomson (October 2, 1878 – 1941) was an American painter. His work was part of the painting event in the art competition at the 1932 Summer Olympics.

References

1878 births
1941 deaths
20th-century American painters
American male painters
Olympic competitors in art competitions
People from San Francisco
20th-century American male artists